TS Empire State V, was a troop ship of the US Navy and training vessel of the United States Maritime Service.  She was laid down as the SS President Jackson, a cargo / passenger liner and finished as a troop transport, the USNS Barrett (T-AP-196). She was converted to a training ship in 1973 serving as the training ship for the State University of New York Maritime College until 1990 when she was replaced by the college's current training ship the USTS Empire State VI.  After serving New York Maritime she was placed in the Maritime Service's National Defense Reserve Fleet at James River until 2007 when she was sold for scrap.

References 

 http://www.globalsecurity.org/military/facility/ft-schuyler.htm
 http://www.globalsecurity.org/military/systems/ship/tap-1001.htm

External links

 

Type P2 ships
Ships built by New York Shipbuilding Corporation
1950 ships
Type P2 ships of the United States Navy
Korean War auxiliary ships of the United States
Vietnam War auxiliary ships of the United States
Training ships of the New York State Merchant Marine Academy
Ships of the Massachusetts Maritime Academy
Historic American Engineering Record in Virginia